Heterochaeta may refer to:
 , a genus of mantises in the family Mantidae
 Heterochaeta, a genus of annelids in the family Naididae, synonym of Baltidrilus
 Heterochaeta, a genus of copepods in the family Heterorhabdidae, synonym of Heterorhabdus
 Heterochaeta, a genus of plants in the family Poaceae, synonym of Ventenata
 Heterochaeta, a genus of plants in the family Asteraceae, synonym of Aster